The Men's 1500m athletics events for the 2012 Summer Paralympics took place at the London Olympic Stadium from 31 August to 4 September. A total of six events were contested over this distance for six different classifications.

Schedule

Results

T11

 

 
Final
 
Competed 3 September 2012 at 20:31.

T13

 

 
Final
 
Competed 4 September 2012 at 19:16.

T20

 
There were no heats in this event. The final was competed on 4 September 2012 at 19:34.
 
Final
 
Competed 4 September 2012 at 19:34.

T37

 
There were no heats in this event. The final was competed on 3 September 2012 at 20:47.
 
Final
 
Competed 3 September 2012 at 20:47.

T46

 

 
Final
 
Competed 4 September 2012 at 20:24.

T54

 

 
Final
 
|-

References

Athletics at the 2012 Summer Paralympics
2012 in men's athletics